"Three Little Words" is a popular song with music by Harry Ruby and lyrics by Bert Kalmar, published in 1930.

The Rhythm Boys (including Bing Crosby), accompanied by the Duke Ellington orchestra, recorded it on August 26, 1930 and it enjoyed great success. Their version was used in the 1930 Amos 'n' Andy film Check and Double Check, with orchestra members miming to it.  The film was co-written by Kalmar and Ruby along with J. Walter Ruben.  The song also figured prominently in the film Three Little Words, a 1950 biopic about Kalmar and Ruby.

Other recordings
Jacques Renard - (1930)
Ipana Troubadors - (1930)
Frank Crumit - (1930)
Ethel Waters - (1931)
Claude Hopkins - (1934)
Django Reinhardt - recorded on June 14, 1938.
Ella Fitzgerald recorded the song in 1941
Sid Phillips and his Orchestra recorded the song in London on September 25, 1950 with a vocal by Johnnie Eager.  It was released by EMI on the His Master's Voice label as catalog number BD 6077.
Al Hirt released a version on his 1961 album He's the King and His Band.
Al Martino recorded the song in 1959 for his album Swing Along with Al Martino and he used the song in his Las Vegas and touring shows as an encore and band solo signature tune.
John Coltrane and Milt Jackson - from the album Bags & Trane which was recorded on January 15, 1959 and released in July 1961.
Carmen McRae recorded the song in 1960 for her album Something to Swing About

Vibraphonist Cal Tjader pn his 1953 album The Cal Tjader Trio
Maurice Chevalier recorded a version and this was included in the album The Very Best of Chevalier (1964)
Stan Getz - from Award Winner: Stan Getz (Verve 1957)
Patti Page included the song in her 1959 album 3 Little Words
Sarah Vaughan recorded the song in her 1959 live album After Hours at the London House
Lou Donaldson - from the album LD + 3
Mel Tormé recorded the song twice. It's included in the 1956 album Mel Tormé Sings and again in his 1992 live album Sing Sing Sing
Gene Ammons - From the album The Soulful Moods of Gene Ammons
Nat King Cole included the song in his 1965 album L-O-V-E.
Camp Galore - from the album Deco Disco (1976)
The Hot Club of Cowtown included a version on their 2019 album Wild Kingdom.
John Pizzarelli included the song in his 1992 album All of Me.
Tyshawn Sorey Trio +1 The Off-Off Broadway Guide To Synergism (2022) two versions

In the mid-1970s the Advertising Council used a fully orchestrated instrumental version of the song in a series of PSAs about seat belt safety; the tag line of these spots was "Seat belts:  a nice way to say 'I Love You'."

Between 1977 and 2002, the channel Saeta TV (Channel 10) from Montevideo, Uruguay had it as a musical curtain for the humor program "Decalegrón" (English: Ten Big Joy)

Actress Judith Roberts sang the song in Woody Allen's 1980 film Stardust Memories.

References

1930 songs
1930 singles
Songs with music by Harry Ruby
Songs with lyrics by Bert Kalmar
Nat King Cole songs